Scalptia hystrix is a species of sea snail, a marine gastropod mollusk in the family Cancellariidae, the nutmeg snails.

Description

Distribution
This marine species occurs off the Gulf of Aden.

References

 Jousseaume, F., 1894. Description d'une espèce nouvelle. Le Naturaliste 8 n°179: 186, sér. 2
 Hemmen, J. (2007). Recent Cancellariidae. Annotated and illustrated catalogue of Recent Cancellariidae. Privately published, Wiesbaden. 428 pp.

External links
 Reeve, L. A. (1856). Monograph of the genus Cancellaria. In: Conchologia Iconica, or, illustrations of the shells of molluscous animals, vol. 10, pl. 1-18 and unpaginated text. L. Reeve & Co., London

Cancellariidae
Gastropods described in 1856